Oba Osinlokun or Eshinlokun (died 1829) reigned as Oba of Lagos from 1821 to 1829 . His father was Oba Ologun Kutere and his siblings were Obas Adele and Akitoye, making the Ologun Kutere Obaship line the dominant one in Lagos. Among Osinlokun's children were Idewu Ojulari, Kosoko, and Opo Olu.

Ascendancy
Around 1820 or 1821, Osinlokun seized on the unpopularity of his younger brother Oba Adele, who was frowned upon for the introduction of the Egun masquerade, which at the time was seen as unbecoming. by forcibly taking the throne in a violent coup.  Adele was exiled to Badagry where he assumed headship of the town. While in Badagry, Adele attempted to violently retake the Lagos throne but his efforts were futile.

Death
Osinlokun died in 1829 and was succeeded by his son Idewu Ojulari.

References

1829 deaths
19th-century Nigerian people
19th-century rulers in Africa
Obas of Lagos
People from Lagos
Nigerian royalty
Year of birth unknown
History of Lagos
19th century in Lagos
People from colonial Nigeria
Yoruba monarchs
19th-century monarchs in Africa
Slave owners
African slave traders
Ologun-Kutere family
African slave owners
Residents of Lagos